Hampton Township is a township in Dakota County, Minnesota, United States. The population was 986 at the 2000 census.

Hampton Township was organized in 1858, and named after Hampton, Connecticut, the birthplace of an early settler.

Geography

The city of Hampton and the city of New Trier are both geographically within Hampton Township but are a separate entities.

Demographics

As of the census of 2000, there were 986 people, 320 households, and 261 families residing in the township. There were 322 housing units at an average density of 9.4/sq mi (3.6/km2). The racial makeup of the township was 98.78% White, 0.20% African American, 0.61% Native American, 0.20% Asian, and 0.20% from two or more races.

There were 320 households, out of which 43.8% had children under the age of 18 living with them, 75.9% were married couples living together, 3.1% had a female householder with no husband present, and 18.4% were non-families. 12.5% of all households were made up of individuals, and 3.1% had someone living alone who was 65 years of age or older.  The average household size was 3.08 and the average family size was 3.42.

In the township the population was spread out, with 32.2% under the age of 18, 7.2% from 18 to 24, 30.5% from 25 to 44, 22.1% from 45 to 64, and 8.0% who were 65 years of age or older.  The median age was 36 years. For every 100 females, there were 105.8 males.  For every 100 females age 18 and over, there were 102.7 males.

The median income for a household in the township was $62,292, and the median income for a family was $68,750. Males had a median income of $46,500 versus $31,023 for females. The per capita income for the township was $25,576.  About 0.8% of families and 2.2% of the population were below the poverty line, including 1.6% of those under age 18 and 2.4% of those age 65 or over.

References

Townships in Dakota County, Minnesota
Townships in Minnesota